Austin Bissell (died 1807) was an officer of the Royal Navy. He was captain of the captured French frigate Créole when she sank on a journey from Jamaica to England.

Naval career

HMS Racoon

On 18 October 1802, Commander Bissell was given command of the 16-gun brig-sloop . While under his command, Racoon took part in several notable actions.

HMS Creole
On Tuesday 3 January 1804, Bissell took command of the captured French frigate Créole in Port Royal, Jamaica. However, the ship foundered en route to Britain; nearby British vessels saved Bissell and his crew.

Death
Bissell died in 1807 when the 74-gun , of which he was then captain, foundered in the Indian Ocean.

Bissell as an author
Bissell wrote a biography of Commodore John Blankett's voyages in the Middle East and India. The book was published in 1806 at the expense of the East India Company.

References

Bibliography

External links
 Austin Bissell on Three Decks

Royal Navy officers
1807 deaths
Year of birth unknown
Deaths due to shipwreck at sea